Abu Taher Mondal is an Indian Bengali politician, social worker and retired civil engineer. He is a four-time MLA of the Phulbari constituency in the Meghalaya Legislative Assembly.

Early life and education
Mondal was born into a Bengali Muslim family in the plains region of the West Garo Hills district of Meghalaya. His father was Samsul Huda Mondal. Mondal graduated in 1991 with a Bachelor of Engineering degree. He owns land in Shyamding and Phulbari.

Career
Despite being an independent candidate during the 1998 Meghalaya Legislative Assembly election, Mondal successfully beat Manirul Islam Sarkar for the Phulbari constituency. Mondal joined the Nationalist Congress Party for the 2003 Meghalaya Legislative Assembly election but was unsuccessful against Sarkar this time. During the 2008 Meghalaya Legislative Assembly election, Mondal became independent once more and beat Sarkar. He managed to preserve his seat at the 2013 Meghalaya Legislative Assembly election, this time as an Indian National Congress candidate. His two-term streak was broken at the 2018 Meghalaya Legislative Assembly election by S. G. Esmatur Mominin.

In March 2013, Mondal was elected Speaker of the Legislative Assembly. He was the first "non-Indigenous" legislator to hold the office.

References

Meghalaya MLAs 1998–2003
Meghalaya MLAs 2008–2013
Meghalaya MLAs 2013–2018
21st-century Bengalis
People from West Garo Hills district
21st-century Indian Muslims
Indian Sunni Muslims
Speakers of the Meghalaya Legislative Assembly
1967 births
Living people
National People's Party (India) politicians
Nationalist Congress Party politicians
Indian National Congress politicians from Meghalaya